Eucithara bathyraphe is a small sea snail, a marine gastropod mollusk in the family Mangeliidae.

Description
The length of the shell attains 5.5 mm, its diameter 2.3 mm.

The shell has a nodose-cancellate shape. It contains 7 whorls, including 2½ whorls in the conical protoconch. The ribs are straight with strong spiral cords and traces of microscopic threads. The outer lip is incrassate and shows 7 small plicae. The aperture is narrow and measures half the total length of the shell. The columella is a callous. The siphonal canal is narrow and very short.

Distribution
This marine species occurs off the Philippines.

References

  Kilburn R.N. 1992. Turridae (Mollusca: Gastropoda) of southern Africa and Mozambique. Part 6. Subfamily Mangeliinae, section 1. Annals of the Natal Museum, 33: 461–575

External links
  Tucker, J.K. 2004 Catalog of recent and fossil turrids (Mollusca: Gastropoda). Zootaxa 682:1-1295
 MNHN, Paris: Eucithara bathyraphe

bathyraphe
Gastropods described in 1882